783 ABC Alice Springs (call sign: 8AL) is the ABC Local Radio station in Alice Springs, Northern Territory. It broadcasts on 783 kHz on the AM band, with low-powered relay stations across the Northern Territory Outback.

The station was officially opened as 5AL on 30 November 1948 as a member of the ABC Regional Network relaying programmes out of Adelaide, and transmitting on a frequency of 1530 kHz. The callsign was changed to 8AL in 1960 and transmitting frequency to 783 in 1978. Employment of local journalists began around 1970.

The station originates four local programs during the week: Breakfast with Stewart Brash, Mornings with Nadine Maloney, Drive with Tim Brunero and Saturday Breakfast with Antony Yoffa.  At all other times, it is a relay of ABC Radio Darwin.

See also
List of radio stations in Australia

References

External links
 ABC Alice Springs Online

Alice Springs
Radio stations in the Northern Territory
Radio stations in Alice Springs